Powley is a surname. Notable people include:

Bel Powley (born 1992), English actress
Bryan Powley (1871–1962), British actor
Dylon Powley (born 1996), Canadian soccer player
John Powley (born 1936), British Conservative Party politician
Lauren Powley (born 1984), American field hockey player
Mark Powley (born 1963), British actor